Kevin O'Hara is the name of:

Kevin O'Hara, pseudonym of Marten Cumberland
Kevin O'Hara (footballer) (born 1998), Scottish footballer